Tabas-e Masina (also Romanized as Ţabas-e Masīnā and Ţabas Masīnā; also known as Ţabas and Masīnā) is a city in, and the capital of, Gazik District of Darmian County, South Khorasan province, Iran. At the 2006 census, its population was 3,776 in 779 households, when it was a village. The following census in 2011 counted 4,133 people in 979 households, by which time the village had been elevated to the status of a city. The latest census in 2016 showed a population of 4,596 people in 1,072 households.

References 

Darmian County

Cities in South Khorasan Province

Populated places in South Khorasan Province

Populated places in Darmian County